Achton Friis  (5 September 1871 – 17 December 1939) was a Danish illustrator, painter and writer. He participated in the Denmark Expedition to Northeast Greenland in 1906–1908, creating a large number of works in the process, both landscape paintings and portraits, as well as a written account which was published in 1909. He later published several comprehensive and richly illustrated works with descriptions of the nature and cultural history of different parts of Denmark. In addition, he designed decorative works for the Bing & Grøndahl porcelain manufacturer.

He is buried at Vestre Cemetery in Copenhagen. His son, Claus Achton Friis, was also a painter and graphic artist.

Early life and education
Friis was born in Trustrup on the Djursland peninsula in 1871. He attended the Royal Danish Academy of Fine Arts in Copenhagen from 1895 to 1899.
He learned etching techniques from Carl Locher in 1900–01.

Danish Expedition to Greenland, 1906-08
[[Image:Danmark i havnen, streng kulde ved solnedgang i begyndelsen af 1907 (Achton Friis).jpg|thumb|200px|left|The edpedition ship 'Denmark' at sunset painted by Friis in early 1907]]
In 1906–08, Friis participated in the Denmark Expedition to northeastern Greenland. His works included oil paintings of landscapes as well as numerous portraits.

Friis' works from the expedition included landscape paintings as well as numerous portraits, both of expedition members and local Inuit. Another artist, Aage Bertelsen, was also a member of the expedition. Friis' and Bertelsen's works from the Denmark Expedition were featured in an exhibition at the Rudolph Tegner Museum in 2011.

Friis also wrote the official travel account from the expedition, Danmark Ekspeditionen til Grønlands Nordøstkyst, which was published in 1909 and reissued in 2005. Friis and Aage Bertelsen's works from the Denmark Expedition to Greenland's North-East Coast was featured in an exhibition at the Rudolph Tegner Museum in 2011. A comprehensive extract from Friis' and Bertelsen's diaries was published in 2013.

"Land of the Danes"
In the 1920s and 1930s, Friis published three comprehensive works with descriptions of the nature and cultural history of different parts of Denmark. They are collectively referred to as De Danskes Land ("Land of the Danes").

The 1200-page De Danskes Øer. Ekspeditionen til de 132 øer ("The Danes' Islands: Expedition to the 132 Islands") was published in three volumes between 1926 and 1928. In 1932–33, it was followed by the two-volume De Jyders Land ("Land of the Jutlanders") about Jutland. In 1936–1937, Friis published Danmarks Store Øer ("Denmark's Large Islands") in two volumes.

All three works contain illustrations by Friis as well as by Johannes Larsen. Andreas Friis and Knud Kyhn also contributed illustrations to Danmarks Store Øer''.

Work for Bing & Grøndahl
He designed ceramics and porcelain for Bing & Grøndahl. His designs included a number of their Christmas plates in the 1920s and 1930s.

Music career
 
Friis also played the mandolin and mandola. His threesome, the Achton Friis Trio, was completed by Johan Tolstrup on mandolin and by Frederik Birket-Smith on theorbo.

Honours
Friis received the Medal of Merit. The Achton Friis Islands, as well as Cape Achton Friis, a headland in Queen Louise Land, were named in his honour.

References

External links

 Achton Friis at Kunstindeks Danmark
 Achton Friis at Artnet

1871 births
1939 deaths
20th-century Danish painters
20th-century Danish illustrators
Danish male writers
People from Norddjurs Municipality
Burials at Vestre Cemetery, Copenhagen